The 2021 Survivor Series was the 35th annual Survivor Series professional wrestling pay-per-view (PPV) and livestreaming event produced by WWE. It was held for wrestlers from the promotion's Raw and SmackDown brand divisions. The event took place on November 21, 2021, at the Barclays Center in Brooklyn, New York, and was the first Survivor Series to air on the livestreaming service Peacock. The theme of the event was brand supremacy and featured wrestlers from the two brands against each other; this was the final Survivor Series to carry the brand supremacy theme.

Seven matches were contested at the event, including one on the Kickoff pre-show. The card was highlighted by two traditional Survivor Series elimination matches: Raw's men's and women's teams were victorious over SmackDown's. In the main event match, SmackDown's Universal Champion Roman Reigns defeated Raw's WWE Champion Big E. In other prominent matches, Raw Tag Team Champions RK-Bro (Randy Orton and Riddle) defeated SmackDown Tag Team Champions The Usos (Jey Uso and Jimmy Uso), and in the opening bout, Raw Women's Champion Becky Lynch defeated SmackDown Women's Champion Charlotte Flair. The event also commemorated the 25th anniversary of The Rock's WWE debut at the 1996 Survivor Series where a 25-man dual-branded battle royal took place in honor of the occasion; Raw's Omos won by last eliminating SmackDown's Ricochet. Raw won brand supremacy by winning five of the seven matches, only excluding the pre-show and main event matches. The event also had a promotional tie-in with the Netflix film Red Notice, which stars The Rock.

Production

Background

Survivor Series is an annual gimmick event produced every November by WWE since 1987. The second longest running pay-per-view (PPV) event in history (behind WWE's WrestleMania), it is one of the promotion's original four pay-per-views, along with WrestleMania, SummerSlam, and Royal Rumble, originally referred to as the "Big Four", and as of August 2021, it is considered one of the "Big Five", along with Money in the Bank. The event is traditionally characterized by having Survivor Series matches, which are tag team elimination matches that typically features teams of four or five wrestlers against each other. Announced on August 16, 2021, the 2021 event was the 35th Survivor Series and was scheduled to be held on November 21, 2021, at the Barclays Center in Brooklyn, New York. The event aired on pay-per-view worldwide and was available to livestream on the WWE Network in international markets, and was the first Survivor Series to livestream on Peacock after the American version of the WWE Network merged under Peacock in March.

Since WWE reintroduced the brand split in July 2016, Survivor Series has also centered around competition between wrestlers from Raw and SmackDown for brand supremacy. In addition to traditional Survivor Series matches between the brands, the champions of Raw face their SmackDown counterparts in non-title matches, which began at the 2017 event. The 2021 Survivor Series featured Raw's WWE Champion against SmackDown's Universal Champion, the Raw Women's Champion against the SmackDown Women's Champion, Raw's United States Champion against SmackDown's Intercontinental Champion, and the Raw Tag Team Champions against the SmackDown Tag Team Champions. The 2019 event had also featured the NXT brand - being elevated to third main brand status with its debut on USA - involved in the competition, making all brand supremacy matches triple threats. NXT was removed from the 2020 event due to COVID-19-related issues, and in September 2021 was repositioned to its previous status as the developmental brand for the main roster under the "NXT 2.0" banner.

Storylines
The event comprised seven matches, including one on the Kickoff pre-show, that resulted from scripted storylines, where wrestlers portrayed heroes, villains, or less distinguishable characters in scripted events that built tension and culminated in a wrestling match or series of matches. Results were predetermined by WWE's writers on the Raw and SmackDown brands, while storylines were produced on WWE's weekly television shows, Monday Night Raw and Friday Night SmackDown.

On November 6, WWE revealed both Raw and SmackDown's team members for the men's Survivor Series match. Team Raw's members were announced to be Seth Rollins, Finn Bálor, Kevin Owens, Rey Mysterio, and Dominik Mysterio. On the November 8 episode of Raw, WWE official Adam Pearce noted that every member of Team Raw was a former world champion, except Dominik. In turn, Pearce scheduled Dominik to face Bobby Lashley where the winner would be on the team; Lashley defeated Dominik. After Rey was seemingly injured during a match with Lashley the following week, Pearce removed Rey from Team Raw and replaced him with Austin Theory. For Team SmackDown, its members were announced as Drew McIntyre, Jeff Hardy, King Woods, Sami Zayn, and Happy Corbin. On the November 12 episode of SmackDown, Hardy defeated Zayn in a match where the loser would be removed from the team. The vacant spot was filled the following week by Sheamus, who won a fatal four-way match to earn the spot.

Also on November 6, WWE revealed both Raw and SmackDown's team members for the women's Survivor Series match. It was announced that Bianca Belair, Liv Morgan, Carmella, Queen Zelina, and one-half of the WWE Women's Tag Team Champions, Rhea Ripley, would represent Team Raw. Team SmackDown's members were revealed to be Sasha Banks, Shayna Baszler, Shotzi, Natalya, and Aliyah. On the November 12 episode of SmackDown, however, WWE official Sonya Deville removed Aliyah from the match seemingly due to her relationship with Naomi, who had been at odds with Deville. On November 18, Deville revealed via WWE's social media that Toni Storm would fill Team SmackDown's vacant spot.

For the champion vs. champion matches, on November 8, WWE announced Raw Women's Champion Becky Lynch vs. SmackDown Women's Champion Charlotte Flair and Raw's WWE Champion Big E vs. SmackDown's Universal Champion Roman Reigns. On November 15, WWE announced Raw Tag Team Champions RK-Bro (Randy Orton and Riddle) vs. SmackDown Tag Team Champions The Usos (Jey Uso and Jimmy Uso) and Raw's United States Champion Damian Priest vs. SmackDown's Intercontinental Champion Shinsuke Nakamura, the latter of which was scheduled for the Kickoff pre-show on the day of the event.

To commemorate the 25th anniversary of The Rock's WWE debut at the 1996 Survivor Series, a 25-man dual-branded battle royal was scheduled to take place at the 2021 event.

Event

Pre-show 
On the Survivor Series Kickoff pre-show, SmackDown's Intercontinental Champion Shinsuke Nakamura (accompanied by Rick Boogs) faced Raw's United States Champion Damian Priest. Priest controlled the match early while Boogs played his guitar to try and distract Priest. Priest performed a Falcon Arrow for a near-fall. Nakamura countered a Chokeslam with his knee. Priest performed a South of Heaven for a nearfall. Priest attempted The Reckoning, but Nakamura countered with an armbar. In the end, Priest broke Boogs' guitar over his knee and hit Boogs over the head before accidentally hitting Nakamura with it and getting himself disqualified, thus Nakamura won, giving SmackDown the first match of the night.

Also during the pre-show, WWE Chairman and Chief Executive Officer Mr. McMahon arrived at the arena holding what he said was a real Cleopatra golden egg, which was part of a promotional tie-in with the Netflix film Red Notice, which stars The Rock.

Preliminary matches 
The actual pay-per-view opened with Raw Women's Champion Becky Lynch taking on SmackDown Women's Champion Charlotte Flair. The two started the match by slapping and hair pulling. Flair attempted the Top Rope Moonsault, but Lynch shoved her off the top rope to the floor. Lynch applied the Dis-Arm-Her, but Flair countered with a Powerbomb. Lynch performed a leg drop to the back of Flair's neck while she was caught up in the ropes. Lynch attempted her own version of Flair's figure-four leglock, but Flair reversed the pressure until Lynch made it to the ropes. Flair performed a Queen's Boot for a nearfall. Lynch performed an Inverted DDT and a Manhandle Slam, but Flair put her foot on the bottom rope to void the pin. Flair performed a Top Rope Moonsault on Lynch outside the ring. Back inside, Flair did a roll-up pin, but the referee caught her holding onto the ropes for leverage. Lynch then reversed the pin and used the ropes herself as leverage to win the match, giving Raw its first match of the night.

Next was the men's Survivor Series elimination match where Team Raw (Seth Rollins, Finn Bálor, Kevin Owens, Bobby Lashley, and Austin Theory) took on Team SmackDown (Drew McIntyre, Jeff Hardy, King Woods, Sheamus, and Happy Corbin). At the start, Owens walked out on his team and got eliminated by countout. Corbin was eliminated by Bálor following a Coup de Grâce. Woods was eliminated by Lashley as he passed out in the Hurt Lock. Lashley and McIntyre fought outside the ring and both were eliminated by countout. Bálor was eliminated by Sheamus after a Brogue Kick. Sheamus was eliminated by Theory with a roll-up. Sheamus attacked Hardy before leaving, but Hardy eliminated Theory after a Swanton Bomb. Hardy performed a Twist of Fate on Rollins, but Rollins got the knees up to block the Swanton Bomb and performed The Stomp on Hardy to win the match as the sole survivor for Team Raw, thus putting the score at 2-1 for Raw.

In a backstage segment, Roman Reigns met with Mr. McMahon in the latter's office. There, McMahon showed Reigns the golden egg that he said was given to him by Reigns' cousin, The Rock, and that it was worth $100 million as it was the real egg and not a prop used in Red Notice.

After that was the 25-man dual-branded battle royal to celebrate the 25th anniversary of The Rock's WWE debut. Raw's Omos dominated the match by eliminating half of the competitors. His tag team partner AJ Styles stayed outside the ring for most of the match, but was eliminated despite help from Omos. Omos won the match after last eliminating SmackDown's Ricochet, thus giving Raw a 3-1 lead over SmackDown.

The fourth match saw Raw Tag Team Champions RK-Bro (Randy Orton and Riddle) taking on SmackDown Tag Team Champions The Usos (Jey Uso and Jimmy Uso). This was Orton's 177th match on pay-per-view, breaking a tie with Kane for most pay-per-view matches contested. In the end, Jey performed a Superkick on Riddle. Both Usos performed Double Superkicks on both Orton and Riddle. Jimmy went for the Uso Splash on Riddle, not knowing that Orton was the legal competitor. Orton caught Jimmy in mid-air with an RKO to win the match, thus putting the score at 4–1 for Raw, clinching brand supremacy for the night.

In another backstage segment, Mr. McMahon, Adam Pearce, and Sonya Deville were talking in McMahon's office when they realized that the golden egg had disappeared. McMahon ordered Deville to call the police and then told Pearce to tell everyone on both the Raw and SmackDown rosters to report to Raw the next night as he was going to get to the bottom of it.

The penultimate match was the women's Survivor Series elimination match where Team Raw (Bianca Belair, Rhea Ripley, Liv Morgan, Carmella, and Queen Zelina) took on Team SmackDown (Sasha Banks, Shayna Baszler, Shotzi, Natalya, and Toni Storm). Carmella was eliminated by Storm after a roll-up while Carmella was trying to put her protective mask on. Storm then eliminated Zelina by performing the Storm One. Morgan eliminated Storm after performing an Oblivion on Storm. Morgan was eliminated by Banks after both Banks and Shotzi performed back-to-back Frog Splashes on Morgan. Baszler eliminated Ripley by pinfall after a Knee Strike, leaving Belair at a 4-1 disadvantage. Banks and Shotzi began to argue as Baszler tried to calm things down, but Banks shoved Shotzi into Baszler. Shotzi, Baszler, and Natalya all kept Banks from returning to the ring, resulting in Banks being eliminated by countout. Natalya locked Belair in the Sharpshooter, but Belair kicked Natalya into Baszler and Belair eliminated Natalya with a roll-up. Belair eliminated Baszler after a Glam Slam and then pinned Shotzi after the Kiss of Death to win the match for Team Raw as the sole survivor, and giving Raw an overall 5-1 lead on the night.

Another backstage segment occurred where interviewer Kayla Braxton informed Roman Reigns' special counsel Paul Heyman that Brock Lesnar's suspension was no longer indefinite.

Main event 
In the main event, Raw's WWE Champion Big E faced SmackDown's Universal Champion Roman Reigns (accompanied by Paul Heyman). Big E attempted the Apron Splash, but Reigns moved out of the way. Big E applied a Stretch Muffler, but Reigns escaped. Reigns performed a Rock Bottom on Big E for a nearfall. Reigns performed a Superman Punch twice, but missed a Spear attempt and Big E performed a Spear through the ropes to put Reigns on the floor. Big E attempted a second one, but Reigns countered with the Guillotine submission. Big E countered the submission and performed a Big Ending on Reigns, who got his foot on the bottom rope during the pin. Reigns performed a Spear for a nearfall. On the outside, Big E threw Reigns into the announce table and the barricade, but Reigns reversed another attack and threw Big E into the steel steps. Reigns performed a Superman Punch, and back in the ring, Reigns attacked Big E's injured knee and performed a second Spear on Big E to win the match. Although this gave SmackDown another win, it was only SmackDown's second win for the night, with the final score being Raw 5, SmackDown 2.

Reception 
The event received mostly negative reviews from critics and fans alike, specifically towards the Survivor Series elimination matches as well as promoting the event as the 25th anniversary of The Rock's WWE debut but without a live appearance or even a pre-recorded message by The Rock himself. The Rock only appeared in archive footage that highlighted his career. 

The event was voted by readers of the Wrestling Observer Newsletter as the Worst Major Wrestling Show of 2021.

Aftermath

Raw 
The following night on Raw, Mr. McMahon addressed the entire Raw and SmackDown roster over the stolen Cleopatra Egg, stating that whoever found it would be rewarded with a WWE Championship match. He also threatened to fire Adam Pearce and Sonya Deville if the egg was not found. Sami Zayn revealed to McMahon that it was Austin Theory who stole the egg, and Theory explained that he had just wanted to take a selfie with it. McMahon was first mad at Theory, but then told Theory he showed intestinal fortitude, rewarding him a WWE Championship match against Big E in the main event, much to Zayn's confusion and displeasure. Theory, however, lost the title match. This began a storyline between McMahon and Theory, with Theory becoming McMahon's protégé until McMahon announced his first retirement in July 2022.

Also on Raw, Seth Rollins talked about being the sole survivor for his team at Survivor Series when Finn Bálor interrupted. The two were scheduled to have a match that night, but it never began when Rollins laid out Bálor with two Stomps. Their match was rescheduled for the following week, where Rollins won.

After the aforementioned title match, Big E attacked Kevin Owens and Seth Rollins, who showed up during the match. The following week, Rollins (who announced that his match against Big E for the WWE Championship would take place at Day 1) attacked Owens during the latter's match against Big E. As a result, Owens was added to the title match, making it a triple threat match. However, two weeks later, it became a fatal four-way match when Bobby Lashley, who recently completed his feud with Rey and Dominik Mysterio, defeated Owens, Rollins, and Big E in a gauntlet match.

SmackDown 
On the following episode of SmackDown, a Black Friday Invitational Battle Royal took place, where the winner would face Roman Reigns for the Universal Championship at a future date. In the end, Jeff Hardy thought he won by last eliminating Happy Corbin, but Sami Zayn, who wasn't officially eliminated, eliminated Hardy to win the match. Immediately afterwards, it was announced that Brock Lesnar's suspension was lifted and he would return the following week. There, he convinced Zayn into cashing in his title shot that night. It was then announced that the winner would defend the title against Lesnar at Day 1. Just before the match, Lesnar attacked Zayn, allowing Reigns to quickly defeat Zayn and retain the title, officially scheduling Reigns to defend the championship against Lesnar at Day 1.

After Shayna Baszler, Shotzi, and Natalya caused Sasha Banks to be eliminated by countout during the women's Survivor Series match, Banks teamed with Naomi, who would continue her feud with Sonya Deville over the next few weeks, to defeat Natalya and Baszler on the following episode of SmackDown.

Future 
The 2021 Survivor Series would be the final Survivor Series to carry the brand supremacy theme, as on September 19, 2022, WWE executive Triple H announced that the 2022 event would not be based on this concept. He also announced that the 2022 event would feature two WarGames matches, one each for the men and women, marking the first time for a main roster WWE event to feature the match. The 2022 event was in turn renamed as Survivor Series WarGames.

Results

Survivor Series elimination matches

References

External links 
 

2021
2021 WWE Network events
2021 WWE pay-per-view events
Events in Brooklyn, New York
Professional wrestling in New York City
2021 in New York City
November 2021 events in the United States